The House of Fear is a 1945 crime film directed by Roy William Neill. It is loosely based on the 1891 short story "The Five Orange Pips" by Arthur Conan Doyle, and features the characters Sherlock Holmes and Dr. Watson. It is the 10th film of the Rathbone/Bruce series.

Plot
Sherlock Holmes is visited by Mr. Chalmers (Gavin Muir), an insurance agent with a strange tale. Seven single men, calling themselves the "Good Comrades", live together in the remote Scottish castle of Drearcliffe House, near the village of Inverneill. Recently one of the "Good Comrades" received a strange message, an envelope containing nothing but seven orange pips (seeds). That night, he was murdered and his body horribly mutilated. A few days later, a second envelope was delivered, this time containing six pips, and the recipient also died mysteriously soon afterwards, his battered corpse being recovered from the base of the cliffs. Chalmers holds £100,000 of life insurance policies on the seven men, and suspects that one is systematically murdering the others in order to collect the money, and begs Holmes to investigate.

Holmes and Dr. Watson arrive at the scene only to find another murder has occurred. His body is burned to a crisp. Inspector Lestrade also arrives to investigate. Despite Holmes' best efforts, three more deaths occur, each time leaving the victim's body unrecognizable. Meanwhile, the local tobacconist Alec MacGregor writes a message to Lestrade, which unfortunately was already opened and resealed before it arrived in the inspector's possession. Holmes and Lestrade went to MacGregor's shop to find out what's going on, only to find that the tobacconist was shot in the back before they got there.

Lestrade jumps to the obvious conclusion that the last surviving member, Bruce Alastair (Aubrey Mather), murdered all the others. However, after Watson goes missing, Holmes has deduced the truth and leads Lestrade (and Alastair) to a secret room where all the "Good Comrades" — alive and well — are hiding with Watson tied up. Holmes explains that Alastair was the victim of a plot to frame him for murder and collect the insurance money by the other six. The six "Good Comrades" murdered MacGregor because he never believed in ghosts and spotted one of them alive on the beach; the message he sent to Lestrade was his death warrant.

Cast
 Basil Rathbone as Sherlock Holmes
 Nigel Bruce as Dr. John Watson
 Aubrey Mather as Bruce Alastair
 Dennis Hoey as Inspector Lestrade
 Paul Cavanagh as Dr. Simon Merivale
 Holmes Herbert as Alan Cosgrave
 Harry Cording as Captain John Simpson
 Sally Shepherd as Mrs. Monteith
 Gavin Muir as Mr. Chalmers
 David Clyde as Alec MacGregor
 Florette Hillier as Alison MacGregor
 Wilson Benge as Guy Davis
 Cyril Delevanti as Stanley Raeburn
 Richard Alexander as Ralph King
 Doris Lloyd as Bessie, Innkeeper
 Alec Craig as Angus
 C.E. Anderson as Mourner (uncredited)
 Leslie Denison as	Sergeant Bleeker (uncredited)

References

External links
 
 
 
 
 

1945 films
1945 mystery films
American mystery films
American black-and-white films
American detective films
Films based on short fiction
Sherlock Holmes films based on works by Arthur Conan Doyle
Universal Pictures films
Films directed by Roy William Neill
Films set in London
Films set in Scotland
American crime films
1945 crime films
Films scored by Paul Sawtell
1940s English-language films
1940s American films